In cricket, a five-wicket haul (also known as a "five–for" or "fifer") refers to a bowler taking five or more wickets in a single innings. A five-wicket haul on debut is regarded by  critics as a notable achievement. As of July 2022, 161 cricketers have taken a five-wicket haul on Test match debut, of which six are from Sri Lanka: Kosala Kuruppuarachchi, Upul Chandana, Akila Dananjaya, Lasith Embuldeniya, Praveen Jayawickrama, and Prabath Jayasuriya. Kuruppuarachchi and Chandana achieved the feat against Pakistan; Dananjaya and Jayawickrama achieved the feat against Bangladesh; Embuldeniya achieved his feat against South Africa, and Jayasuriya against Australia.

Chandana is the only Sri Lankan to get a five-wicket haul in a losing cause, during the 1998–99 Asian Test Championship at Bangabandhu National Stadium, Dhaka. Jayawickrama and Jayasuriya both went on to take fifers in the second innings.

Key

Five-wicket hauls

References

Sri Lanka
Lists of Sri Lankan international cricketers